Cartoon Network is an international children's television programming brand. Here is a list of Cartoon Network feeds around the world:

 Cartoon Network (US) in English
 Cartoon Network Arabic in Arabic
 Cartoon Network (Australian and New Zealand TV channel) in English
 Cartoon Network (Canadian TV channel) in English
 Cartoon Network (Central and Eastern Europe) in Romanian, Hungarian, Czech and English
 Cartoon Network (Middle Eastern and African TV channel) in Arabic, Greek and English
 Cartoon Network (French TV channel) in French and English
 Cartoon Network (German TV channel) in German and English
 Cartoon Network Hindi in Hindi
 Cartoon Network (Indian TV channel) in English, Hindi and Tamil
 Cartoon Network HD+ in English, Hindi, Tamil and Telugu
 Cartoon Network Israel in Hebrew (A programming block on Arutz HaYeladim until 2019)
 Cartoon Network (Italian TV channel) in Italian and English
 Cartoon Network (Japanese TV channel) in Japanese and mostly English as well
 Cartoon Network (Latin American TV channel) in Latin American Spanish, Brazilian Portuguese and English
 Cartoon Network (Dutch TV channel) in Dutch and English
 Cartoon Network (Scandinavian TV channel) in Danish, Swedish, Norwegian, Finnish and English
 Cartoon Network (Pakistani TV channel) English and Urdu
 Cartoon Network (Philippine TV channel) in English
 Cartoon Network (Polish TV channel) in Polish and English
 Cartoon Network (Portuguese TV channel) in European Portuguese
 Cartoon Network (Russian & Southeastern European TV channel) in Russian, Bulgarian and English
 Cartoon Network (South Korean TV channel) in Korean
 Cartoon Network (Asian TV channel) in English, Indonesian, Thai, Malay, Mandarin, Cantonese, Vietnamese, Tamil and Khmer
 Cartoon Network (Spanish TV channel) in Castilian Spanish and English until 2013
 Cartoon Network (Turkish TV channel) in Turkish and English
 Cartoon Network (British and Irish TV channel) in English

Other
 Cartoon Network Studios, an animation studio based in Burbank, California
 Cartoon Network Too, a British television channel
 List of international Cartoon Network channels, a list of Cartoon Network and sister-channels from around the world.

See also
 Cartoon Cartoons
 Cartoon Network Original Series and Movies

Cartoon Network

az:Cartoon Network
pt:Cartoon Network
ro:Cartoon Network
ta:கார்ட்டூன் நெட்வொர்க் (தொடர்பு கட்டுரைகள்)
th:การ์ตูนเน็ตเวิร์ก